Cassyma is a genus of moths in the family Geometridae first described by Achille Guenée in 1857. Its species are found primarily in South and Southeast Asia.

Species
Cassyma amplexaria (Walker, 1862)
Cassyma chrotadelpha Sommerer & Stuning, 1992
Cassyma chrotodon (Prout, 1925)
Cassyma deletaria (Moore, 1888)
Cassyma electrodes Sommerer & Stuning, 1992
Cassyma erythrodon Sommerer & Stuning, 1992
Cassyma indistincta (Moore, 1887)
Cassyma lucifera (Warren, 1903)
Cassyma pallidula Warren, 1896
Cassyma quadrinata Guenée, 1857
Cassyma sciticincta (Walker, 1863)
Cassyma undifasciata (Butler, 1892)

References

Kandasamy, Gunathilagaraj (2016). "Checklist of Indian Geometridae with FBI number". Tamil Nadu Agricultural University.

Abraxini
Geometridae